Acoustics is an EP by Phoenix, Arizona pop rock group This Century. It was released on January 21, 2012, and includes four acoustic tracks from their previous full-length album Sound of Fire as well as a new song entitled "Indigo Girl".

Track listing

Personnel
Members
 Joel Kanitz – Vocals
 Sean Silverman – Guitar
 Alex Silverman – Bass, keyboard
 Ryan Gose – Drums

References

External links 

 

2012 EPs